Keltie Colleen Knight (née Busch; born January 28, 1982) is a Canadian television personality, actress, podcast host, author, and former professional dancer. She was formerly the weekend co-host and correspondent for the syndicated show The Insider; she is now a correspondent for Entertainment Tonight.

Keltie Knight is an E! News Chief Correspondent. Knight danced professionally for The Rockettes and both the New Jersey Nets and the New York Knicks. She has also performed at award shows for several artists, including Taylor Swift. Knight has also been featured in numerous music videos as a dancer before becoming a TV presenter. Since becoming a correspondent in 2012 for The Insider, she has been featured regularly in the press as a fashion icon. In 2015 Knight co-founded The LadyGang podcast with co-hosts Becca Tobin and Jac Vanek. The podcast has over 100,000 downloads and has had several successful collaborations and endeavors including live podcast tours, a clothing collaboration with Express, and a New York Times Best Selling book.

She was in a bad auto accident in April, 2018 and suffered a broken right hand. As with Mary Hart in 2009, she wore various brightly colored slings designed to match or complement her wardrobe, for each show taped during her recovery.

Early life
Knight was born in Edmonton, Alberta, on January 28, 1982; she was raised in Sherwood Park. At an early age she took up dance lessons in a variety of different dance fields and competed throughout Canada in dance competitions. At the age of 8, she undertook her first worldwide competition.

Her dancing career started before she finished high school, which eventually led Knight to the United States, where she accepted her first professional dancing job.

Career
Knight started her dancing career in the United States as a specialist dancer and was featured on music videos and as part of a number of professional dance teams. In 2003, Knight became a professional cheerleader for the NBA team the New Jersey Nets for a period of two years. She remained as a cheerleader in the NBA and also was a cheerleader for the New York Knicks dancing with them until 2007. During this period, she also appeared on Saturday Night Live as a dancer in 2006.

Her music video dancing led her to perform with John Legend, Gym Class Heroes and Fergie from 2007 onwards. In 2009, she featured on the cover of Dance Spirit Magazine. She danced for a number of music artists from 2007 onwards, including Taylor Swift. Knight was interviewed on a VMA after show in 2010 discussing Swift's recovery, following Kanye West's controversial appearance on stage with Swift while she was receiving her award at the 2009 MTV Video Music Awards. Prior to this, she danced for the likes of Beyoncé. She also spent 6 seasons as a Radio City Rockette.

Her dancing also led her to perform on the big screen in both Enchanted in 2007 and Footloose in 2011.

In 2010, Knight began to become more focused on presenting. She became the host of a Live Nation online music series, where she regularly interviewed musicians and attended music festivals across the US as a TV presenter. After working with Live Nation, Knight began working with Alloy TV and presenting the show Living the Dream. The show focused on individuals and their jobs, primarily those who had unique types of employment, some of which could be described as a dream job.  Knight was featured on the fifteenth season of The Bachelor as a contestant dating Brad Womack on his second stint at finding love. She was credited as Keltie Colleen during that time and discussed her time as a Rockette on that season.

Following her roles as a television presenter, Knight became an on-air correspondent in 2012 for the syndicated show, The Insider. As a correspondent she covered numerous red carpet events. In 2013, she covered the 65th Primetime Emmy Awards and the 56th Annual Grammy Awards in 2014 for Insider. Other events she has covered have included The Vanity Fair Oscar Party, The Independent Spirit Awards, The People's Choice Awards, and The American Music Awards

After a number of years as a correspondent, Knight became a weekend co-host for The Insider show. At the Palm Springs International Film Festival in 2014, Knight interviewed Julia Roberts, Tom Hanks and also Bradley Cooper. In early 2014, Knight interviewed Jennifer Lawrence regarding her appearance in The Hunger Games: Catching Fire. In early 2014, she also interviewed Miley Cyrus regarding her Bangerz Tour. After the release of Adam Levine's fragrance, Knight interviewed Levine on The Insider.
In 2015, she had a cameo role in the movie Sharknado 3: Oh Hell No! where she played a Times reporter. Keltie hosted the 2015 "Thanksgiving Day Parade Live on CBS" with Entertainment Tonight co-host Kevin Frazier
Keltie was a preliminary judge at the 2016 Miss USA Pageant.  After The Insider ended production on September 8, 2017, she joined Entertainment Tonight.

Since December 2015, Keltie has co-hosted the female-centric podcast series LadyGang with Becca Tobin and Jac Vanek. The podcast was nominated in the People’s Choice Awards for Pop Podcast of 2018.

On October 28, 2018, LadyGang premiered on E! with Knight, Jac Vanek, and Becca Tobin serving as hosts. Guests on the show included Sabrina Carpenter and Ed Sheeran.

Fashion
As a presenter, Knight's outfits have been regularly featured internationally in leading publications. Following her appearance at The Grammy Awards in 2014, she was featured in the Netherlands edition of Vogue. Her popularity in the Netherlands continued, when she was featured in Elle magazine for the dress she wore at the People's Choice Awards in 2014.

She has also been featured in the Spanish edition of Glamour in 2014, along with BELLO, People, Vogue Italia, Marie Claire, and New York magazine.

Personal life

Knight lives in Los Angeles, California with her husband of nine years, music producer, Chris Knight and their dog, Callie. She was previously in a relationship with former Panic! At the Disco guitarist, Ryan Ross from 2006 to 2009. She is an avid reader and DIY’er.

References

1982 births
Canadian television personalities
Living people
People from Edmonton
Bachelor Nation contestants
Canadian women television personalities